Mizugatoro Dam is a concrete gravity dam located in Yamagata Prefecture in Japan. The dam is used for power production. The catchment area of the dam is 259.8 km2. The dam impounds about 25  ha of land when full and can store 1936 thousand cubic meters of water. The construction of the dam was started on 1980 and completed in 1990.

References

Dams in Yamagata Prefecture
1990 establishments in Japan